The Valley Times may refer to any of the following newspapers:

 Valley Times (North Las Vegas), a defunct daily in North Las Vegas, Nevada, U.S.
 The Valley Times (Scottsdale, Arizona), a U.S. weekly
 Alberni Valley Times, in Port Alberni, Vancouver Island, B.C., Canada
 Beaverton Valley Times (named simply The Valley Times from 1962 to 1989), in Beaverton, Oregon, U.S.
 Dupont Valley Times, in Fort Wayne, Indiana, U.S.
 San Fernando Valley Times, a newspaper serving California's San Fernando Valley
 St. John Valley Times, in Maine, U.S.
 Contra Costa Times, in Walnut Creek, California, U.S., which publishes (or published) some editions as the Valley Times